Swiggers may refer to:

Francine Swiggers, a Belgian businesswoman
Ronny Swiggers (born 1961), Belgian successful quiz player

See also
Swig (disambiguation)
Swigger, a person who drinks a lot of the specified liquid, usually alcohol. Refer to Alcohol intoxication